Elizabeth Nesbitt (April 15, 1897 – August 17, 1977), also known as Betty Nesbitt was an American children's librarian and a library science educator. She was known “internationally as an authority on children's literature”, and made “(s)trong contributions” to children's librarianship.

Early life and education
Elizabeth Nesbitt was born on April 15, 1897, in Northumberland, Pennsylvania, north of Harrisburg on the Susquehanna River, United States. After completing her studies in a private school, she earned the A.B. degree from the Goucher College for women, Baltimore in 1918. She also got another bachelor's degree in library science from Carnegie Library School in 1931. She went on to earn a master's degree in English from the University of Pittsburgh in 1935.

Career
In 1919 her family moved from Philadelphia to Pittsburgh. She briefly worked as a teacher in a private school in Pittsburgh. She later joined as an assistant at the Carnegie Library School of Pittsburgh. In 1948 she was appointed as associate dean of the Carnegie Library School, and she held this position until her retirement in 1962. She then became a lecturer of the Graduate School of Library and Information Sciences of the University of Pittsburgh. During the summers she taught library sciences related courses in a number of prominent higher educational institutions including Columbia University and University of Illinois. She was associated with a number of professional associations such as Pennsylvania Library Association and American Library Association.

She was also known as a storyteller.

Publications
Elizabeth Nesbitt co-authored  A Critical History of Children's Literature, which remains “a landmark publication” in the field.

Awards and honors
Elizabeth Nesbitt received numerous awards and honors for her contributions in the field of library sciences and children's literature.
These include
Pittsburgh’s Ten Women of Talent (1955)
Distinguished Daughter of Pennsylvania (1958)
  Distinguished Service Award (1962) by the Pennsylvania Library Association
Beta Phi Mu Award for Distinguished Service 
Clarence Day Award  (1965) by the American Library Association

In her honor, in 1976, the University of Pittsburgh named a room at the Graduate School of Library and Information Sciences, as the Elizabeth Nesbitt Room, which houses an important historical collection of children's books.

She died at the age of 80 in Atlantic City, New Jersey, on August 17, 1977, of “cancer”.

References

1897 births
1977 deaths
American librarians
People from Northumberland, Pennsylvania
Goucher College alumni
University of Pittsburgh alumni
American Library Association people
American women academics
Deaths from cancer in New Jersey